Chester Aldrich may refer to:

Chester Hardy Aldrich, (1862–1924) 19th Governor of Nebraska
Chester Holmes Aldrich, (1871–1940) American architect of the early 20th century